Eugène-Louis Doyen (16 December 1859 – 21 November 1916) was a French surgeon born in Reims. He was the son of Octave Doyen (1831–1895), who served as mayor of Reims.

Eugène Doyen studied medicine in Reims and Paris, and later opened a private medical institute in Paris that attracted a wealthy clientele. Doyen was a skilled and innovative physician who introduced several surgical techniques and medical instruments, some of which bear his name today. He was a pioneer in the use of electrosurgery and electrocoagulation, and also marketed a yeast extract he called "mycolysine" for treatment of infectious diseases.

He had a keen interest in photography and cinematography, and performed early experiments of color film, microcinematography and stereoscopic film. He produced numerous films of operations, including a craniectomy, an abdominal hysterectomy, and a surgery for separation of conjoined twins Radhika and Dudhika Nayak, united in the area of the xiphoid process of the sternum. Although his films were popular at medical conferences abroad, they were harshly criticized by his contemporaries in France, who felt that the integrity of their profession had been compromised.

For a period of time, Doyen was editor-in-chief of the Revue Critique de Médecine et de Chirurgie, as well as the Archives de Doyen, a medico-surgical journal of the Doyen Institute.

Selected written works 
 Atlas de microbiologie, 1897 - Atlas of microbiology.
 Etiologie et traitement du cancer, 1904 – Etiology and treatment of cancer.
 Le Traitement des infections staphylococciques, 1906 – Treatment of staphylococcal infection. 
 Traité de thérapeutique chirurgicale et de technique opératoire, 1908 – Treatise on therapeutic surgery and operative techniques.
 Atlas d'anatomie topographique, 1911 – Atlas of topographic anatomy.
 "Surgical therapeutics and operative technique". (published in English, in collaboration with H. Spencer-Browne), New York, William Wood, 1917–20.
 Volume 1. Introduction, general surgical technique, regional surgery head.
 Volume 2. Regional surgery (continued), operations on the head (continued), thorax, upper and lower limbs.
 Volume 3. Regional surgery (continued), operations on the abdomen.

References

External links 
 Bibliothèque interuniversitaire de Médecine The Scandalous Dr. Doyen, or the Solitary Tragedy of a Prodigy, (biography)
 Who's Who of Victorian Cinema

French surgeons
People from Reims
1859 births
1916 deaths